Trojstveni Markovac  is a suburb of the city of Bjelovar. It is connected by the D43 highway.

Populated places in Bjelovar-Bilogora County